Stephen Edwin King (born September 21, 1947) is an American author of horror, supernatural fiction, suspense, crime, science-fiction, and fantasy novels. Described as the "King of Horror", a play on his surname and a reference to his high standing in pop culture, his books have sold more than 350 million copies, and many have been adapted into films, television series, miniseries, and comic books. King has published 64 novels, including seven under the pen name Richard Bachman, and five non-fiction books. He has also written approximately 200 short stories, most of which have been published in book collections.

King has received Bram Stoker Awards, World Fantasy Awards, and British Fantasy Society Awards. In 2003, the National Book Foundation awarded him the Medal for Distinguished Contribution to American Letters. He has also received awards for his contribution to literature for his entire bibliography, such as the 2004 World Fantasy Award for Life Achievement and the 2007 Grand Master Award from the Mystery Writers of America. In 2015, he was awarded with a National Medal of Arts from the U.S. National Endowment for the Arts for his contributions to literature.

Early life
King was born in Portland, Maine, on September 21, 1947. His father, Donald Edwin King, a travelling vacuum salesman after returning from World War II, was born in Indiana with the surname Pollock, changing it to King as an adult. King's mother was Nellie Ruth King (née Pillsbury). His parents were married in Scarborough, Maine on July 23, 1939. Shortly afterwards, they lived with Donald's family in Chicago before moving to Croton-on-Hudson, New York. King's parents returned to Maine towards the end of World War II, living in a modest house in Scarborough. When King was two, his father left the family. His mother raised him and his older brother David by herself, sometimes under great financial strain. They moved from Scarborough and depended on relatives in Chicago; Croton-on-Hudson; West De Pere, Wisconsin; Fort Wayne, Indiana; Malden, Massachusetts; and Stratford, Connecticut. When King was 11, his family moved to Durham, Maine, where his mother cared for her parents until their deaths. She then became a caregiver in a local residential facility for the mentally challenged. King was raised Methodist, but lost his belief in organized religion while in high school. While no longer religious, he says he chooses to believe in the existence of God.

As a child, King apparently witnessed one of his friends being struck and killed by a train, though he has no memory of the event. His family told him that after leaving home to play with the boy, King returned speechless and seemingly in shock. Only later did the family learn of the friend's death. Some commentators have suggested that this event may have psychologically inspired some of King's darker works, but King makes no mention of it in his memoir On Writing (2000). He related in detail his primary inspiration for writing horror fiction in his non-fiction Danse Macabre (1981), in a chapter titled "An Annoying Autobiographical Pause". He compared his uncle's dowsing for water using the bough of an apple branch with the sudden realization of what he wanted to do for a living. That inspiration occurred while browsing through an attic with his elder brother, when King uncovered a paperback version of an H. P. Lovecraft collection of short stories he remembers as The Lurker in the Shadows, that had belonged to his father. King told Barnes & Noble Studios in a 2009 interview, "I knew that I'd found home when I read that book."

King attended Durham Elementary School and graduated from Lisbon High School (Maine) in Lisbon Falls, Maine, in 1966. He displayed an early interest in horror as an avid reader of EC horror comics, including Tales from the Crypt, and he later paid tribute to the comics in his screenplay for Creepshow. He began writing for fun while in school, contributing articles to Dave's Rag, the newspaper his brother published with a mimeograph machine, and later began selling stories to his friends based on movies he had seen. (He was forced to return the profits when it was discovered by his teachers.) The first of his stories to be independently published was "I Was a Teenage Grave Robber", which was serialized over four issues (three published and one unpublished) of a fanzine, Comics Review, in 1965. It was republished the following year in revised form, as "In a Half-World of Terror", in another fanzine, Stories of Suspense, edited by Marv Wolfman. As a teen, King also won a Scholastic Art and Writing Award.

King entered the University of Maine in 1966, and graduated in 1970 with a Bachelor of Arts in English. That year, his daughter Naomi Rachel was born. He wrote a column, Steve King's Garbage Truck, for the student newspaper, The Maine Campus, and participated in a writing workshop organized by Burton Hatlen. King held a variety of jobs to pay for his studies, including as a janitor, a gas-station attendant, and an industrial laundry worker. He met his wife, fellow student Tabitha Spruce, at the university's Raymond H. Fogler Library after one of Professor Hatlen's workshops; they wed in 1971.

Career

Beginnings

King sold his first professional short story, "The Glass Floor", to Startling Mystery Stories in 1967.

After graduating from the University of Maine, King earned a certificate to teach high school but, unable to find a teaching post immediately, he supplemented his laboring wage by selling short stories to men's magazines such as Cavalier. Many of these early stories were republished in the collection Night Shift. The short story "The Raft" was published in Adam, a men's magazine. After being arrested for stealing traffic cones (he was annoyed after one of the cones knocked his muffler loose), he was fined $250 for petty larceny but had no money to pay. However, a check then arrived for "The Raft" (then titled "The Float"), and King cashed it to pay the fine. In 1971, King was hired as a teacher at Hampden Academy in Hampden, Maine. He continued to contribute short stories to magazines and worked on ideas for novels. During 1966–1970, he wrote a draft about his dystopian novel called The Long Walk and the anti-war novel Sword in the Darkness, but neither of the works was published at the time; only The Long Walk was later released in 1979.

Carrie and aftermath
In 1973, King's novel, Carrie, was accepted by publishing house, Doubleday. It was King's fourth novel, but the first to be published. He wrote it on his wife Tabitha's portable typewriter. It began as a short story intended for Cavalier magazine, but King tossed the first three pages in the garbage can. Tabitha recovered the pages and encouraged him to finish the story, saying she would help him with the female perspective; he followed her advice and expanded it into a novel. He said: "I persisted because I was dry and had no better ideas… My considered opinion was that I had written the world's all-time loser." According to The Guardian, Carrie "is the story of Carrie White, a high-school student with latent—and then, as the novel progresses, developing—telekinetic powers. It's brutal in places, affecting in others (Carrie's relationship with her almost hysterically religious mother being a particularly damaged one), and gory in even more."

When Carrie was chosen for publication, King's phone was out of service. Doubleday editor William Thompson—who became King's close friend—sent a telegram to King's house in late March or early April 1973 which read: "Carrie Officially A Doubleday Book. $2,500 Advance Against Royalties. Congrats, Kid – The Future Lies Ahead, Bill." King said he bought a new Ford Pinto with the advance. On May 13, 1973, New American Library bought the paperback rights for $400,000, which—in accordance with King's contract with Doubleday—was split between them. Carrie set King's career in motion and became a significant novel in the horror genre. In 1976, it was made into a successful horror film.

King's 'Salem's Lot was published in 1975. In a 1987 issue of The Highway Patrolman magazine, he said, "The story seems sort of down home to me. I have a special cold spot in my heart for it!" After his mother's death, King and his family moved to Boulder, Colorado, where he wrote The Shining (published 1977). The family returned to Auburn, Maine in 1975, where he completed The Stand (published 1978). In 1977, the family, with the addition of Owen Philip, his third and youngest child, traveled briefly to England. They returned to Maine that fall, where King began teaching creative writing at the University of Maine.

In 1982, King published Different Seasons, a collection of four novellas with a more serious dramatic bent than the horror fiction for which he is famous. It is notable for having three of its four novellas turned into Hollywood films: Stand by Me (1986) was adapted from The Body; The Shawshank Redemption (1994) was adapted from Rita Hayworth and Shawshank Redemption; and Apt Pupil (1998) was adapted from the novella of the same name.

In 1985, King wrote his first work for the comic book medium, writing a few pages of the benefit X-Men comic book Heroes for Hope Starring the X-Men. The book, whose profits were donated to famine relief in Africa, was written by a number of different authors in the comic book field, such as Chris Claremont, Stan Lee, and Alan Moore, as well as authors not primarily associated with comics, such as Harlan Ellison. The following year, King published It (1986), which was the best-selling hardcover novel in the United States that year, and wrote the introduction to Batman No. 400, an anniversary issue where he expressed his preference for the character over Superman.

The Dark Tower books

In the late 1970s, King began what became a series of interconnected stories about a lone gunslinger, Roland, who pursues the "Man in Black" in an alternate-reality universe that is a cross between J. R. R. Tolkien's Middle-earth and the American Wild West as depicted by Clint Eastwood and Sergio Leone in their spaghetti Westerns. The first of these stories, The Dark Tower: The Gunslinger, was initially published in five installments by The Magazine of Fantasy & Science Fiction under the editorship of Edward L. Ferman, from 1977 to 1981. The Gunslinger was continued as an eight-book epic series called The Dark Tower, whose books King wrote and published infrequently over four decades (1978-2012).

Pseudonyms
In the late 1970s and early 1980s, King published a handful of short novels—Rage (1977), The Long Walk (1979), Roadwork (1981), The Running Man (1982) and Thinner (1984)—under the pseudonym Richard Bachman. The idea behind this was to test whether he could replicate his success again and to allay his fears that his popularity was an accident. An alternate explanation was that publishing standards at the time allowed only a single book a year. He picked up the name from the Canadian hard rock band Bachman–Turner Overdrive, of which he is a fan.

Richard Bachman was exposed as King's pseudonym by a persistent Washington, D.C. bookstore clerk, Steve Brown, who noticed similarities between the works and later located publisher's records at the Library of Congress that named King as the author of one of Bachman's novels. This led to a press release heralding Bachman's "death"—supposedly from "cancer of the pseudonym". King dedicated his 1989 book The Dark Half, about a pseudonym turning on a writer, to "the deceased Richard Bachman", and in 1996, when the Stephen King novel Desperation was released, the companion novel The Regulators carried the "Bachman" byline.

In 2006, during a press conference in London, King declared that he had discovered another Bachman novel, titled Blaze. It was published on June 12, 2007. In fact, the original manuscript had been held at King's Alma mater, the University of Maine in Orono, for many years and had been covered by numerous King experts. King rewrote the original 1973 manuscript for its publication.

King has used other pseudonyms. The short story "The Fifth Quarter" was published under the pseudonym John Swithen (the name of a character in the novel Carrie), by Cavalier in April 1972. The story was reprinted in King's collection Nightmares & Dreamscapes in 1993 under his own name. In the introduction to the Bachman novel Blaze, King claims, with tongue-in-cheek, that "Bachman" was the person using the Swithen pseudonym.

The "children's book" Charlie the Choo-Choo: From the World of The Dark Tower was published in 2016 under the pseudonym Beryl Evans, who was portrayed by actress Allison Davies during a book signing at San Diego Comic-Con, and illustrated by Ned Dameron. It is adapted from a fictional book central to the plot of King's previous novel The Dark Tower III: The Waste Lands.

Digital era

In 2000, King published online a serialized horror novel, The Plant. At first the public assumed that King had abandoned the project because sales were unsuccessful, but King later stated that he had simply run out of stories. The unfinished epistolary novel is still available from King's official site, now free. Also in 2000, he wrote a digital novella, Riding the Bullet, and saying he foresaw e-books becoming 50% of the market "probably by 2013 and maybe by 2012". However, he also stated: "Here's the thing—people tire of the new toys quickly."

King wrote the first draft of the 2001 novel Dreamcatcher with a notebook and a Waterman fountain pen, which he called "the world's finest word processor".

In August 2003, King began writing a column on pop culture appearing in Entertainment Weekly, usually every third week. The column was called The Pop of King (a play on the nickname "The King of Pop" commonly attributed to Michael Jackson).

In 2006, King published an apocalyptic novel, Cell. The book features a sudden force in which every cell phone user turns into a mindless killer. King noted in the book's introduction that he does not use cell phones.

In 2008, King published both a novel, Duma Key, and a collection, Just After Sunset. The latter featured 13 short stories, including a previously unpublished novella, N. Starting July 28, 2008, N. was released as a serialized animated series to lead up to the release of Just After Sunset.

In 2009, King published Ur, a novella written exclusively for the launch of the second-generation Amazon Kindle and available only on Amazon.com, and Throttle, a novella co-written with his son Joe Hill and released  later as an audiobook titled Road Rage, which included Richard Matheson's short story "Duel". King's novel Under the Dome was published on November 10 of that year; it is a reworking of an unfinished novel he tried writing twice in the late 1970s and early 1980s, and at 1,074 pages, it is the largest novel he has written since It (1986). Under the Dome debuted at No. 1 in The New York Times Bestseller List.

On February 16, 2010, King announced on his Web site that his next book would be a collection of four previously unpublished novellas called Full Dark, No Stars. In April of that year, King published Blockade Billy, an original novella issued first by independent small press Cemetery Dance Publications and later released in mass-market paperback by Simon & Schuster. The following month, DC Comics premiered American Vampire, a monthly comic book series written by King with short-story writer Scott Snyder, and illustrated by Rafael Albuquerque, which represents King's first original comics work. King wrote the background history of the very first American vampire, Skinner Sweet, in the first five-issues story arc. Scott Snyder wrote the story of Pearl.

King's next novel, 11/22/63, was published November 8, 2011, and was nominated for the 2012 World Fantasy Award Best Novel.  The eighth Dark Tower volume, The Wind Through the Keyhole, was published in 2012. King's next book was Joyland, a novel about "an amusement-park serial killer", according to an article in The Sunday Times, published on April 8, 2012.

During his Chancellor's Speaker Series talk at University of Massachusetts Lowell on December 7, 2012, King indicated that he was writing a crime novel about a retired policeman being taunted by a murderer. With a working title Mr. Mercedes and inspired by a true event about a woman driving her car into a McDonald's restaurant, it was originally meant to be a short story just a few pages long. In an interview with Parade, published on May 26, 2013, King confirmed that the novel was "more or less" completed he published it in June 2014. Later, on June 20, 2013, while doing a video chat with fans as part of promoting the upcoming Under the Dome TV series, King mentioned he was halfway through writing his next novel, Revival, which was released November 11, 2014.

King announced in June 2014 that Mr. Mercedes is part of a trilogy; the second book, Finders Keepers, was released on June 2, 2015. On April 22, 2015, it was revealed that King was working on the third book of the trilogy, End of Watch, which was ultimately released on June 7, 2016.

During a tour to promote End of Watch, King revealed that he had collaborated on a novel, set in a women's prison in West Virginia, with his son, Owen King, titled Sleeping Beauties.

In 2018, he released the novel The Outsider, which featured the character of Holly Gibney, and the novella Elevation. In 2019, he released the novel The Institute. In 2020, King released If It Bleeds, a collection of four previously unpublished novellas. In 2022, King released his latest novel, Fairy Tale.

Collaborations

Writings
King has written two novels with horror novelist Peter Straub: The Talisman (1984) and a sequel, Black House (2001). King has indicated that he and Straub would likely write the third and concluding book in this series, the tale of Jack Sawyer,  but after Straub passed away in 2022 the future of the series is in doubt.

King produced an artist's book with designer Barbara Kruger, My Pretty Pony (1989), published in a limited edition of 250 by the Library Fellows of the Whitney Museum of American Art. Alfred A. Knopf released it in a general trade edition.

The Diary of Ellen Rimbauer: My Life at Rose Red (2001) was a paperback tie-in for the King-penned miniseries Rose Red (2002). Published under anonymous authorship, the book was written by Ridley Pearson. The novel is written in the form of a diary by Ellen Rimbauer, and annotated by the fictional professor of paranormal activity, Joyce Reardon. The novel also presents a fictional afterword by Ellen Rimbauer's grandson, Steven. Intended to be a promotional item rather than a stand-alone work, its popularity spawned a 2003 prequel television miniseries to Rose Red, titled The Diary of Ellen Rimbauer. This spin-off is a rare occasion of another author being granted permission to write commercial work using characters and story elements invented by King. The novel tie-in idea was repeated on Stephen King's next project, the miniseries Kingdom Hospital. Richard Dooling, King's collaborator on Kingdom Hospital and writer of several episodes in the miniseries, published a fictional diary, The Journals of Eleanor Druse, in 2004. Eleanor Druse is a key character in Kingdom Hospital, much as Dr. Joyce Readon and Ellen Rimbauer are key characters in Rose Red.

Throttle (2009), a novella written in collaboration with his son Joe Hill, appears in the anthology He Is Legend: Celebrating Richard Matheson.  Their second novella collaboration, In the Tall Grass (2012), was published in two parts in Esquire. It was later released in e-book and audiobook formats, the latter read by Stephen Lang.

King and his son Owen King wrote the novel Sleeping Beauties, released in 2017, that is set in a women's prison.

King and Richard Chizmar collaborated to write Gwendy's Button Box (2017), a horror novella taking place in King's fictional town of Castle Rock. A sequel titled Gwendy's Magic Feather (2019) was written solely by Chizmar. In November 2020, Chizmar announced that he and King were writing a third installment in the series titled Gwendy's Final Task, this time as a full-length novel, to be released in February 2022.

Music
In 1988, the band Blue Öyster Cult recorded an updated version of its 1974 song "Astronomy". The single released for radio play featured a narrative intro spoken by King. The Blue Öyster Cult song "(Don't Fear) The Reaper" was also used in the King TV series The Stand.

King collaborated with Michael Jackson to create Ghosts (1996), a 40-minute musical video. King states he was motivated to collaborate as he is "always interested in trying something new, and for (him), writing a minimusical would be new". In 2005, King featured with a small spoken word part during the cover version of Everlong (by Foo Fighters) in Bronson Arroyo's album Covering the Bases, at the time, Arroyo was a pitcher for Major League Baseball team Boston Red Sox of whom King is a longtime fan. In 2012, King collaborated with musician Shooter Jennings and his band Hierophant, providing the narration for their album, Black Ribbons. King played guitar for the rock band Rock Bottom Remainders, several of whose members are authors. Other members include Dave Barry, Ridley Pearson, Scott Turow, Amy Tan, James McBride, Mitch Albom, Roy Blount, Jr., Matt Groening, Kathi Kamen Goldmark, Sam Barry, and Greg Iles. King and the other band members collaborated to release an e-book called Hard Listening: The Greatest Rock Band Ever (of Authors) Tells All (June 2013). King wrote a musical entitled Ghost Brothers of Darkland County (2012) with musician John Mellencamp.

Analysis

Writing style and approach

King's formula for learning to write well is: "Read and write four to six hours a day. If you cannot find the time for that, you can't expect to become a good writer." He sets out each day with a quota of 2000 words and will not stop writing until it is met. He also has a simple definition for talent in writing: "If you wrote something for which someone sent you a check, if you cashed the check and it didn't bounce, and if you then paid the light bill with the money, I consider you talented."

When asked why he writes, King responds: "The answer to that is fairly simple—there was nothing else I was made to do. I was made to write stories and I love to write stories. That's why I do it. I really can't imagine doing anything else and I can't imagine not doing what I do." He is also often asked why he writes such terrifying stories and he answers with another question: "Why do you assume I have a choice?" King usually begins the story creation process by imagining a "what if" scenario, such as what would happen if a writer is kidnapped by a sadistic nurse in Colorado.

King often uses authors as characters, or includes mention of fictional books in his stories, novellas and novels, such as Paul Sheldon, who is the main character in Misery, adult Bill Denbrough in It, Ben Mears in 'Salem's Lot, and Jack Torrance in The Shining. He has extended this to breaking the fourth wall by including himself as a character in The Dark Tower series from The Dark Tower V: Wolves of the Calla onwards. In September 2009 it was announced he would serve as a writer for Fangoria.

Influences
King has called Richard Matheson "the author who influenced me most as a writer". In a current edition of Matheson's The Shrinking Man, King is quoted as saying, "A horror story if there ever was one...a great adventure story—it is certainly one of that select handful that I have given to people, envying them the experience of the first reading."

Other acknowledged influences include H. P. Lovecraft, Arthur Machen, Ray Bradbury, Joseph Payne Brennan, Elmore Leonard, John D. MacDonald, and Don Robertson.

King's The Shining is immersed in gothic influences, including "The Masque of the Red Death" by Edgar Allan Poe (which was directly influenced by the first gothic novel, Horace Walpole's The Castle of Otranto). The Overlook Hotel acts as a replacement for the traditional gothic castle, and Jack Torrance is a tragic villain seeking redemption.

King's favorite books are (in order): The Golden Argosy; Adventures of Huckleberry Finn; The Satanic Verses; McTeague; Lord of the Flies; Bleak House; Nineteen Eighty-Four; The Raj Quartet; Light in August; and Blood Meridian.

Critical response
Science fiction editors John Clute and Peter Nicholls offer a largely favorable appraisal of King, noting his "pungent prose, sharp ear for dialogue, disarmingly laid-back, frank style, along with his passionately fierce denunciation of human stupidity and cruelty (especially to children) [all of which rank] him among the more distinguished 'popular' writers."

In his book The Philosophy of Horror (1990), Noël Carroll discusses King's work as an exemplar of modern horror fiction. Analyzing both the narrative structure of King's fiction and King's non-fiction ruminations on the art and craft of writing, Carroll writes that for King, "the horror story is always a contest between the normal and the abnormal such that the normal is reinstated and, therefore, affirmed."

In his analysis of post–World War II horror fiction, The Modern Weird Tale (2001), critic S. T. Joshi devotes a chapter to King's work. Joshi argues that King's best-known works are his worst, describing them as mostly bloated, illogical, maudlin and prone to deus ex machina endings. Despite these criticisms, Joshi argues that since Gerald's Game (1993), King has been tempering the worst of his writing faults, producing books that are leaner, more believable and generally better written.

In 1996, King won an O. Henry Award for his short story "The Man in the Black Suit".

In his short story collection A Century of Great Suspense Stories, editor Jeffery Deaver noted that King "singlehandedly made popular fiction grow up. While there were many good best-selling writers before him, King, more than anybody since John D. MacDonald, brought reality to genre novels. He has often remarked that 'Salem's Lot was "Peyton Place meets Dracula. And so it was. The rich characterization, the careful and caring social eye, the interplay of story line and character development announced that writers could take worn themes such as vampirism and make them fresh again. Before King, many popular writers found their efforts to make their books serious blue-penciled by their editors. 'Stuff like that gets in the way of the story,' they were told. Well, it's stuff like that that has made King so popular, and helped free the popular name from the shackles of simple genre writing. He is a master of masters."

In 2003, King was honored by the National Book Awards with a lifetime achievement award, the Medal of Distinguished Contribution to American Letters. Some in the literary community expressed disapproval of the award: Richard E. Snyder, the former CEO of Simon & Schuster, described King's work as "non-literature" and critic Harold Bloom denounced the choice:

The decision to give the National Book Foundation's annual award for "distinguished contribution" to Stephen King is extraordinary, another low in the shocking process of dumbing down our cultural life. I've described King in the past as a writer of penny dreadfuls, but perhaps even that is too kind. He shares nothing with Edgar Allan Poe. What he is is an immensely inadequate writer on a sentence-by-sentence, paragraph-by-paragraph, book-by-book basis.

Orson Scott Card responded:

Let me assure you that King's work most definitely is literature, because it was written to be published and is read with admiration. What Snyder really means is that it is not the literature preferred by the academic-literary elite.

In 2008, King's book On Writing was ranked 21st on Entertainment Weeklys list of "The New Classics: The 100 Best Reads from 1983 to 2008".

Political views and activism

In 1984, King endorsed Gary Hart's presidential campaign.

In April 2008, King spoke out against HB 1423, a bill pending in the Massachusetts state legislature that would restrict or ban the sale of violent video games to anyone under the age of 18. King argued that such laws allow legislators to ignore the economic divide between the rich and poor and the easy availability of guns, which he believed were the actual causes of violence.

During the 2008 presidential election, King voiced his support for Democratic candidate Barack Obama. King was quoted as calling conservative commentator Glenn Beck "Satan's mentally challenged younger brother".

On March 8, 2011, King spoke at a political rally in Sarasota aimed against Governor Rick Scott (R-FL), voicing his opposition to the Tea Party movement.

On April 30, 2012, King published an article in The Daily Beast calling for rich Americans, including himself, to pay more taxes, citing it as "a practical necessity and moral imperative that those who have received much should be obligated to pay ... in the same proportion".

On January 25, 2013, King published an essay titled "Guns" via Amazon.com's Kindle single feature, which discusses the gun debate in the wake of the Sandy Hook Elementary School shooting. King called for gun owners to support a ban on automatic and semi-automatic weapons, writing, "Autos and semi-autos are weapons of mass destruction...When lunatics want to make war on the unarmed and unprepared, these are the weapons they use." The essay became the fifth-bestselling non-fiction title for the Kindle.

King has criticized Donald Trump and Rep. Steve King, deeming them racists.

In June 2018, King called for the release of the Ukrainian filmmaker Oleg Sentsov, who was jailed in Russia.

In the 2020 Democratic Party presidential primaries, King endorsed Elizabeth Warren's campaign. Warren eventually suspended her campaign, and King later endorsed Joe Biden's campaign in the 2020 general election.

In 2022, during the Russian invasion of Ukraine, King expressed support for Ukraine. On his Twitter account, King posted a photo in an "I stand with Ukraine" t-shirt and later tweeted that he refuses to cooperate with Russian publishers.

In July 2022, Stephen King appeared in a video call with the Russian pranksters Vovan and Lexus who played the role of Volodymyr Zelenskyy. In the call Stephen King said "You can always find things about people to pull them down. Washington and Jefferson were slave owners — that doesn't mean they didn't do many good things to the United States of America. There are always people who have flaws, we are humans. On the whole, I think Bandera is a great man, and you're a great man, and Viva Ukraine!" However, King later realized that he was pranked and apologized on Twitter, noting that he wasn't the only victim and "other victims who fell for these guys include J.K. Rowling, Prince Harry, and Justin Trudeau".

King testified in an August 2022 in a case brought by the U.S. Justice Department to block a $2.2 billion merger of Penguin Random House and Simon & Schuster (two of the "Big Five" book publishers). The New York Times credited King's high-profile testimony, which was against his own publisher, with helping to convince presiding judge Florence Y. Pan with ultimately blocking the merger.

Maine politics
King endorsed Shenna Bellows in the 2014 U.S. Senate election for the seat held by Republican Susan Collins.

King publicly criticized Paul LePage during LePage's tenure as Governor of Maine, referring to him as one of The Three Stooges (with then-Florida Governor Rick Scott and then-Wisconsin Governor Scott Walker being the other two). He was critical of LePage for incorrectly suggesting in a 2015 radio address that King avoided paying Maine income taxes by living out of state for part of the year. The statement was later corrected by the Governor's office, but no apology was issued. King said LePage was "full of the stuff that makes the grass grow green" and demanded that LePage "man up and apologize". LePage declined to apologize to King, stating, "I never said Stephen King did not pay income taxes. What I said was, Stephen King's not in Maine right now. That's what I said."

The attention garnered by the LePage criticism led to efforts to encourage King to run for Governor of Maine in 2018. King said he would not run or serve. King sent a tweet on June 30, 2015, calling LePage "a terrible embarrassment to the state I live in and love. If he won't govern, he should resign." He later clarified that he was not calling on LePage to resign, but to "go to work or go back home". On August 27, 2016, King called LePage "a bigot, a homophobe, and a racist".

Philanthropy
King has stated that he donates approximately $4 million per year "to libraries, local fire departments that need updated lifesaving equipment (Jaws of Life tools are always a popular request), schools, and a scattering of organisations that underwrite the arts."

The Stephen and Tabitha King Foundation, chaired by King and his wife, ranks sixth among Maine charities in terms of average annual giving, with over $2.8 million in grants per year, according to The Grantsmanship Center.

In November 2011, the STK Foundation donated $70,000 in matched funding via his radio station to help pay the heating bills for families in need in his hometown of Bangor, Maine, during the winter.

In February 2021, King's Foundation donated $6,500 to help children from the Farwell Elementary School in Lewiston, Maine, to publish two novels on which they had been working over the course of several prior years, before being stopped due to the COVID-19 pandemic in Maine.

Personal life

King married Tabitha Spruce on January 2, 1971. She too is a novelist and philanthropic activist. They own and divide their time between three houses: one in Bangor, Maine, one in Lovell, Maine, and for the winter a waterfront mansion located off the Gulf of Mexico in Sarasota, Florida.

The Kings have three children—a daughter and two sons. Their daughter Naomi is a Unitarian Universalist Church minister in Plantation, Florida, with her partner, Thandeka. Both of the Kings' sons are authors: Owen King published his first collection of stories, We're All in This Together: A Novella and Stories, in 2005. Joseph Hillström King, who writes as Joe Hill, published his first collection of short stories, 20th Century Ghosts, in 2005.

King has a history of abusing alcohol and other drugs. He wrote of his struggles with addiction in On Writing. Soon after Carries release in 1974, King's mother died of uterine cancer; King has written of his severe drinking problem at this time, stating that he was drunk while delivering the eulogy at his mother's funeral. King's substance addictions were so serious during the 1980s that, as he acknowledged in On Writing in 2000, he can barely remember writing Cujo. Shortly after Cujo's publication, King's family and friends staged an intervention, dumping in front of him evidence of his addictions taken from his office, including beer cans, cigarette butts, grams of cocaine, Xanax, Valium, NyQuil, Robitussin, and mouthwash. As King related in On Writing, he then sought help, and became sober in the late 1980s. The first novel he wrote after becoming sober was Needful Things.

King told Bon Appétit magazine in 2013 that he married Tabitha "because of the fish that she cooked for me." He said his favorite foods are baked salmon and cheesecake.  A recipe from King, Lunchtime Gloop, is included in the 2020 cookbook Maine Bicentennial Community Cookbook. The Rachael Ray magazine printed the recipe as made with "greasy hamburger" and canned spaghetti.

King and his wife Tabitha own Zone Radio Corp, a radio station group consisting of WZON/620 AM, WKIT/100.3 & WZLO/103.1.

In sports, King is a longtime fan of Major League Baseball team Boston Red Sox. His nonfiction book Faithful published in 2004, co-written with his friend and fellow author Stewart O'Nan, chronicles the exchanges between King and O'Nan (also a longtime fan of the Red Sox) about the historic 2004 Boston Red Sox season that culminated with the Red Sox winning the 2004 World Series, ending an 86-year championship drought.

Car accident and aftermath 
On June 19, 1999, at about 4:30 p.m., King was walking on the shoulder of Maine State Route 5, in Lovell, Maine. Driver Bryan Edwin Smith, distracted by an unrestrained dog moving in the back of his minivan, struck King, who landed in a depression in the ground about 14 feet (four meters) from the pavement of Route 5. Early reports at the time from Oxford County Sheriff deputy Matt Baker claimed King was hit from behind, and some witnesses said the driver was not speeding, reckless, or drinking. However, Smith was later arrested and charged with driving to endanger and aggravated assault. He pleaded guilty to the lesser charge of driving to endanger and was sentenced to six months in county jail (suspended) and had his driving license suspended for a year. In his book On Writing, King states he was heading north, walking against the traffic. Shortly before the accident took place, a woman in a car, also northbound, passed King first followed by a light blue Dodge van. The van was looping from one side of the road to the other, and the woman told her passenger she hoped "that guy in the van doesn't hit him."

King was conscious enough to give the deputy phone numbers to contact his family but was in considerable pain. He was transported to Northern Cumberland Hospital in Bridgton and then flown by air ambulance to Central Maine Medical Center (CMMC) in Lewiston. His injuries—a collapsed right lung, multiple fractures of his right leg, scalp laceration and a broken hip—kept him at CMMC until July 9. His leg bones were so shattered that doctors initially considered amputating his leg but stabilized the bones in the leg with an external fixator. After five operations in 10 days and physical therapy, King resumed work on On Writing in July, though his hip was still shattered and he could sit for only about 40 minutes before the pain became unbearable.

King's lawyer and two others purchased Smith's van for $1,500, reportedly to prevent it from appearing on eBay. The van was later crushed at a junkyard, to King's disappointment, as he had fantasized about smashing it.

Awards

 American Library Association Best Books for Young Adults
 1978: 'Salem's Lot
1979: "The Long Walk"
 1981: Firestarter
 American Library Association Alex Awards 2009: Just After Sunset
Audie Award
Best Unabridged Fiction Audiobook
2002: "The Talisman"
Best Fiction Audiobook
2009: "Duma Key"
2014: "Doctor Sleep"
Best Thriller / Suspense Audiobook
2020:
 Balrog Award Best Collection / Anthology 1980: Night Shift
 Black Quill Award Best Dark Genre Novel 2009: Duma Key
 Bram Stoker Award
Best Novel
 1987: Misery
1996: "The Green Mile" 
1998: "Bag of Bones" 
2014: "Doctor Sleep"
Best Novellette 1995: "Lunch at the Gotham Cafe"
Best Fiction Collection
 1990: Four Past Midnight
 2009: "Just After Sunset"
 2011: "Full Dark, No Stars"
Best Non-Fiction
2000: "On Writing: A Memoir of the Craft"
Best Short Fiction
2012: "Herman Wouk is Still Alive"
 1995: "Lunch at the Gotham Café"
 2000: On Writing
 2000: "Riding the Bullet"
 2002: Lifetime Achievement Award
 2003: The Dark Tower V: Wolves of the Calla
 2006: Lisey's Story
 2008: Duma Key
 2008: Just After Sunset
 2010: Full Dark, No Stars
 2011: "Herman Wouk Is Still Alive"
 2013: Doctor Sleep
 British Fantasy Award
 1981: Special Award
 1982: Cujo
 1983: "The Breathing Method"
 1987: It
 1999: Bag of Bones
 2005: The Dark Tower VII: The Dark Tower
 Deutscher Phantastik Preis
 2000: Hearts in Atlantis
 2001: The Green Mile
 2003: Black House
 2004: International Author of the Year
 2005: The Dark Tower VII: The Dark Tower
 Edgar Award for Best Novel
 2015: Mr. Mercedes

 Horror Guild
 1997: Desperation
 2001: Riding the Bullet
 2001: On Writing
 2002: Black House
 2003: From a Buick 8
 2003: Everything's Eventual
 Hugo Award 1982: Danse Macabre
 International Horror Guild Awards
 1999: Storm of the Century
 2003: Living Legend
 Kono Mystery ga Sugoi! (The Best Translated Mystery Fiction of the Year in Japan)
 2014: 11/22/63
 Los Angeles Times Book Prize
 2011: 11/22/63
 Locus Awards
 1982: Danse Macabre
 1986: Skeleton Crew
 1997: Desperation
 1999: Bag of Bones
 2001: On Writing
 Mystery Writers of America 2007: Grand Master Award
 National Book Award 2003: Medal of Distinguished Contribution to American Letters
 National Magazine Awards
 2004: "Rest Stop"
 2013: "Batman and Robin Have an Altercation"
 New York Public Library Books for the Teen Age 1982: Firestarter
 O. Henry Award 1996: "The Man in the Black Suit"
 Quill Award 2005: Faithful
 Shirley Jackson Award 2009: "Morality"
 Spokane Public Library Golden Pen Award 1986: Golden Pen Award
 Takarajimasha Award 1st place 11/22/63
 University of Maine 1980: Alumni Career Award
 Us Magazine 1982: Best Fiction Writer of the Year
 World Fantasy Award
 1980: Convention Award
 1982: "Do the Dead Sing?"
 1995: "The Man in the Black Suit"
 2004: Lifetime Achievement
 World Horror Convention 1992: World Horror Grandmaster

Bibliography

Audiobooks 
 2000: On Writing: A Memoir of the Craft (read by Stephen King), Simon & Schuster Audio. .
 2004: Salem's Lot (introduction), Simon & Schuster Audio. .
 2005 (Audible: 2000): Bag of Bones (read by Stephen King). Simon & Schuster Audio. .
 2008: Needful Things (read by Stephen King), Highbridge Audio. .
 2012: The Wind Through The Keyhole – A Dark Tower Novel (read by Stephen King), Simon & Schuster Audio. .
 2016: Desperation (read by Stephen King), Simon & Schuster Audio. .
 2018: Elevation (read by Stephen King), Simon & Schuster Audio. .

Filmography

See also

 List of adaptations of works by Stephen King
 Castle Rock (Stephen King)
 Charles Scribner's Sons (aka Scribner)
 Derry (Stephen King)
 Dollar Baby
 Jerusalem's Lot (Stephen King)
 Haven

References

Further reading

External links

 
 Stephen King on Twitter
 Working with the King – Shotsmag Ezine Interview with Philippa Pride, King's UK editor
 
 
 
 
 
 

 
1947 births
20th-century American essayists
20th-century American male writers
20th-century American non-fiction writers
20th-century American novelists
20th-century American poets
20th-century American short story writers
20th-century pseudonymous writers
21st-century American essayists
21st-century American male writers
21st-century American non-fiction writers
21st-century American novelists
21st-century American poets
21st-century American short story writers
21st-century pseudonymous writers
American crime writers
American fantasy writers
American film directors
American gun control activists
American horror novelists
American male essayists
American male film actors
American male non-fiction writers
American male novelists
American male poets
American male screenwriters
American male short story writers
American mystery writers
American opinion journalists
American philanthropists
American psychological fiction writers
American science fiction writers
American screenwriters
American short story writers
American social commentators
American thriller writers
Former Methodists
Critics of neoconservatism
Cthulhu Mythos writers
Dark fantasy writers
Edgar Award winners
Florida Democrats
Ghost story writers
Hugo Award-winning writers
Living people
The Magazine of Fantasy & Science Fiction people
Maine culture
Maine Democrats
Male feminists
National Book Award winners
Novelists from Florida
Novelists from Maine
O. Henry Award winners
People from Lisbon, Maine
People from Lovell, Maine
People from Scarborough, Maine
People from Sarasota, Florida
Philanthropists from Maine
Rock Bottom Remainders members
Schoolteachers from Maine
Science fiction critics
Teachers of English
United States National Medal of Arts recipients
University of Maine alumni
Weird fiction writers
World Fantasy Award-winning writers
Writers about activism and social change
Writers about religion and science
Writers from Bangor, Maine
Writers from Portland, Maine
Writers of books about writing fiction
Writers of Gothic fiction